Wambaya may refer to:

Wambaya people
Wambaya language

Language and nationality disambiguation pages